The Pipa Lake is a lake in Taitung City, Taitung County, Taiwan.

Name
The lake is named Pipa because it resembles the shape of a pipa where it has a shape of two connected water bodies, in which one is the bigger one and the other is the smaller one.

Geology
The lake is the habitat for aquatic animals and plants. The lake forms a part of the Taitung Forest Park. The lake is equipped with viewing platform, cabin and bike routes.

See also
 Geography of Taiwan
 List of lakes of Taiwan

References

Lakes of Taitung County
Lakes of Taiwan